Comocritis circulata is a moth in the family Xyloryctidae. It was described by Edward Meyrick in 1918. It is found in southern India.

The forewings are white tinged blue, strewn with scattered black scales except towards the base. There are black median and subdorsal dots very near the base, and three others in a slightly curved transverse series at one-fifth. The hindwings are grey.

The larvae feed on Eugenia jambolana.

References

Comocritis
Taxa named by Edward Meyrick
Moths described in 1918